Dennis Liddiard is an American make-up artist. He was nominated for an Academy Award in the category Best Makeup and Hairstyling for the film Foxcatcher. Liddiard was the son of Gary Liddiard, a make-up artist who has worked on films such as The Great Gatsby and The Sting.

Selected filmography 
 Foxcatcher (2014; co-nominated with Bill Corso)

References

External links 

Living people
Year of birth missing (living people)
Place of birth missing (living people)
American make-up artists